Conostephium roei is a species of flowering plant in the family Ericaceae and is endemic to the southwest of Western Australia. It is an erect shrub with egg-shaped, oblong or linear leaves with and white and purple or reddish brown flowers.

Description
Flowering occurs from August to October.

Taxonomy and naming
Conostephium roei was first formally described in 1868 by George Bentham in Flora Australiensis from specimens collected "in the interior" by John Septimus Roe. The specific epithet (roei) honours the collector of the type specimens.

Distribution and habitat
This species usually grows near salt lakes in sandy soil, and occurs between Ongerup, Lake Magenta and Newdegate in the Mallee bioregion of southern Western Australia.

Conservation status
This conostephium is listed as "not threatened" by the Western Australian Government Department of Biodiversity, Conservation and Attractions.

References

roei
Epacridoideae
Eudicots of Western Australia
Ericales of Australia
Endemic flora of Western Australia
Plants described in 1868
Taxa named by George Bentham